New Zealand football team may refer to national teams in the different varieties of football:

 New Zealand national football team, the association football team (soccer), nicknamed the All Whites.
 New Zealand national rugby league team, often nicknamed the Kiwis, administered by New Zealand Rugby League.
 New Zealand national rugby union team, better known as the All Blacks, administered by New Zealand Rugby.
 New Zealand national rugby sevens team, All Blacks Sevens, compete in the World Sevens Series